The Geography (Geōgraphikḕ Hyphḗgēsis,  "Geographical Guidance"), also known by its Latin names as the  and the , is a gazetteer, an atlas, and a treatise on cartography, compiling the geographical knowledge of the 2nd-century Roman Empire. Originally written by Claudius Ptolemy in Greek at Alexandria around AD 150, the work was a revision of a now-lost atlas by Marinus of Tyre using additional Roman and Persian gazetteers and new principles. Its translation into Arabic in the 9th century and Latin in 1406 was highly influential on the geographical knowledge and cartographic traditions of the medieval Caliphate and Renaissance Europe.

Manuscripts
Versions of Ptolemy's work in antiquity were probably proper atlases with attached maps, although some scholars believe that the references to maps in the text were later additions.

No Greek manuscript of the Geography survives from earlier than the 13th century. A letter written by the Byzantine monk Maximus Planudes records that he searched for one for Chora Monastery in the summer of 1295; one of the earliest surviving texts may have been one of those he then assembled. In Europe, maps were sometimes redrawn using the coordinates provided by the text, as Planudes was forced to do. Later scribes and publishers could then copy these new maps, as Athanasius did for the emperor Andronicus II Palaeologus. The three earliest surviving texts with maps are those from Constantinople (Istanbul) based on Planudes's work.

The first Latin translation of these texts was made in 1406 or 1407 by Jacobus Angelus in Florence, Italy, under the name . It is not thought that his edition had maps, although Manuel Chrysoloras had given Palla Strozzi a Greek copy of Planudes's maps in Florence in 1397.

Contents
The Geography consists of three sections, divided among 8 books. Book I is a treatise on cartography and chorography, describing the methods used to assemble and arrange Ptolemy's data. From Book II through the beginning of Book VII, a gazetteer provides longitude and latitude values for the world known to the ancient Romans (the "ecumene"). The rest of Book VII provides details on three projections to be used for the construction of a map of the world, varying in complexity and fidelity. Book VIII constitutes an atlas of regional maps. The maps include a recapitulation of some of the values given earlier in the work, which were intended to be used as captions to clarify the map's contents and maintain their accuracy during copying.

Cartographical treatise
Maps based on scientific principles had been made in Europe since the time of Eratosthenes in the 3rd century BC. Ptolemy improved the treatment of map projections. He provided instructions on how to create his maps in the first section of the work.

Gazetteer
The gazetteer section of Ptolemy's work provided latitude and longitude coordinates for all the places and geographical features in the work. Latitude was expressed in degrees of arc  from the equator, the same system that is used now, though Ptolemy used fractions of a degree rather than minutes of arc. His Prime Meridian, of 0 longitude, ran through the Fortunate Isles, the westernmost land recorded, at around the position of El Hierro in the Canary Islands. The maps spanned 180 degrees of longitude from the Fortunate Isles in the Atlantic to China.

Ptolemy was aware that Europe knew only about a quarter of the globe.

Atlas
Ptolemy's work included a single large and less detailed world map and then separate and more detailed regional maps. The first Greek manuscripts compiled after Maximus Planudes's rediscovery of the text had as many as 64 regional maps. The standard set in Western Europe came to be 26: 10 European maps, 4 African maps, and 12 Asian maps. As early as the 1420s, these canonical maps were complemented by extra-Ptolemaic regional maps depicting, e.g., Scandinavia.

Image Gallery

History

Antiquity
The original treatise by Marinus of Tyre that formed the basis of Ptolemy's Geography has been completely lost. A world map based on Ptolemy was displayed in Augustodunum (Autun, France) in late Roman times. Pappus, writing at Alexandria in the 4th century, produced a commentary on Ptolemy's Geography and used it as the basis of his (now lost) Chorography of the Ecumene. Later imperial writers and mathematicians, however, seem to have restricted themselves to commenting on Ptolemy's text, rather than improving upon it; surviving records actually show decreasing fidelity to real position. Nevertheless, Byzantine scholars continued these geographical traditions throughout the Medieval period.

Whereas previous Greco-Roman geographers such as Strabo and Pliny the Elder demonstrated a reluctance to rely on the contemporary accounts of sailors and merchants who plied distant areas of the Indian Ocean, Marinus and Ptolemy betray a much greater receptiveness to incorporating information received from them. For instance, Grant Parker argues that it would be highly implausible for them to have constructed the Bay of Bengal as precisely as they did without the accounts of sailors. When it comes to the account of the Golden Chersonese (i.e. Malay Peninsula) and the Magnus Sinus (i.e. Gulf of Thailand and South China Sea), Marinus and Ptolemy relied on the testimony of a Greek sailor named Alexandros, who claimed to have visited a far eastern site called "Cattigara" (most likely Oc Eo, Vietnam, the site of unearthed Antonine-era Roman goods and not far from the region of Jiaozhi in northern Vietnam where ancient Chinese sources claim several Roman embassies first landed in the 2nd and 3rd centuries).

Medieval Islam 

 
Muslim cartographers were using copies of Ptolemy's Almagest and Geography by the 9th century. At that time, in the court of the caliph al-Maʾmūm, al-Khwārazmī compiled his Book of the Depiction of the Earth which mimicked the Geography in providing the coordinates for 545 cities and regional maps of the Nile, the Island of the Jewel, the Sea of Darkness, and the Sea of Azov. A 1037 copy of these are the earliest extant maps from Islamic lands. The text clearly states that al-Khwārazmī was working from an earlier map, although this could not have been an exact copy of Ptolemy's work: his Prime Meridian was 10° east of Ptolemy's, he adds some places, and his latitudes differ. C.A. Nallino suggests that the work was not based on Ptolemy but on a derivative world map, presumably in Syriac or Arabic. The coloured map of al-Maʾmūm constructed by a team including al-Khwārazmī was described by the Persian encyclopædist al-Masʿūdī around 956 as superior to the maps of Marinus and Ptolemy, probably indicating that it was built along similar mathematical principles. It included 4530 cities and over 200 mountains.

Despite beginning to compile numerous gazetteers of places and coordinates indebted to Ptolemy, Muslim scholars made almost no direct use of Ptolemy's principles in the maps which have survived. Instead, they followed al-Khwārazmī's modifications and the orthogonal projection advocated by Suhrāb's early 10th-century treatise on the Marvels of the Seven Climes to the End of Habitation. Surviving maps from the medieval period were not done according to mathematical principles. The world map from the 11th-century Book of Curiosities is the earliest surviving map of the Muslim or Christian worlds to include a geographic coordinate system but the copyist seems to have not understood its purpose, starting it from the left using twice the intended scale and then (apparently realizing his mistake) giving up halfway through. Its presence does strongly suggest the existence of earlier, now-lost maps which had been mathematically derived in the manner of Ptolemy, al-Khwārazmi, or Suhrāb. There are surviving reports of such maps.

Ptolemy's Geography was translated from Arabic into Latin at the court of King Roger II of Sicily in the 12th century AD. However, no copy of that translation has survived.

Renaissance

The Greek text of the Geography reached Florence from Constantinople in about 1400 and was translated into Latin by Jacobus Angelus of Scarperia around 1406. The first printed edition with maps, published in 1477 in Bologna, was also the first printed book with engraved illustrations. Many editions followed (more often using woodcut in the early days), some following traditional versions of the maps, and others updating them. An edition printed at Ulm in 1482 was the first one printed north of the Alps.  Also in 1482, Francesco Berlinghieri printed the first edition in vernacular Italian.

Ptolemy had mapped the whole world from the Fortunatae Insulae (Cape Verde or Canary Islands) eastward to the eastern shore of the Magnus Sinus. This known portion of the world was comprised within 180 degrees. In his extreme east Ptolemy placed Serica (the Land of Silk), the Sinarum Situs (the Port of the Sinae), and the emporium of Cattigara. On the 1489 map of the world by Henricus Martellus, which was based on Ptolemy's work, Asia terminated in its southeastern point in a cape, the Cape of Cattigara. Cattigara was understood by Ptolemy to be a port on the Sinus Magnus, or Great Gulf, the actual Gulf of Thailand, at eight and a half degrees north of the Equator, on the coast of Cambodia, which is where he located it in his Canon of Famous Cities. It was the easternmost port reached by shipping trading from the Graeco-Roman world to the lands of the Far East.
In Ptolemy's later and better-known Geography, a scribal error was made and Cattigara was located at eight and a half degrees South of the Equator. On Ptolemaic maps, such as that of Martellus, Catigara was located on the easternmost shore of the Mare Indicum, 180 degrees East of the Cape St Vincent at, due to the scribal error, eight and a half degrees South of the Equator.

Catigara is also shown at this location on Martin Waldseemüller's 1507 world map, which avowedly followed the tradition of Ptolemy. Ptolemy's information was thereby misinterpreted so that the coast of China, which should have been represented as part of the coast of eastern Asia, was falsely made to represent an eastern shore of the Indian Ocean. As a result, Ptolemy implied more land east of the 180th meridian and an ocean beyond. Marco Polo’s account of his travels in eastern Asia described lands and seaports on an eastern ocean apparently unknown to Ptolemy. Marco Polo’s narrative authorized the extensive additions to the Ptolemaic map shown on the 1492 globe of Martin Behaim. The fact that Ptolemy did not represent an eastern coast of Asia made it admissible for Behaim to extend that continent far to the east. Behaim’s globe placed Marco Polo’s Mangi and Cathay east of Ptolemy’s 180th meridian, and the Great Khan’s capital, Cambaluc (Beijing), on the 41st parallel of latitude at approximately 233 degrees East. Behaim allowed 60 degrees beyond Ptolemy’s 180 degrees for the mainland of Asia and 30 degrees more to the east coast of Cipangu (Japan). Cipangu and the mainland of Asia were thus placed only 90 and 120 degrees, respectively, west of the Canary Islands.

The Codex Seragliensis was used as the base of a new edition of the work in 2006. This new edition was used to "decode" Ptolemy's coordinates of Books 2 and 3 by an interdisciplinary team of TU Berlin, presented in publications in 2010 and 2012.

Influence on Christopher Columbus 
Christopher Columbus modified this geography further by using 53⅔ Italian nautical miles as the length of a degree instead of the longer degree of Ptolemy, and by adopting Marinus of Tyre’s longitude of 225 degrees for the east coast of the Magnus Sinus. This resulted in a considerable eastward advancement of the longitudes given by Martin Behaim and other contemporaries of Columbus. By some process Columbus reasoned that the longitudes of eastern Asia and Cipangu respectively were about 270 and 300 degrees east, or 90 and 60 degrees west of the Canary Islands. He said that he had sailed 1100 leagues from the Canaries when he found Cuba in 1492. This was approximately where he thought the coast of eastern Asia would be found. On this basis of calculation he identified Hispaniola with Cipangu, which he had expected to find on the outward voyage at a distance of about 700 leagues from the Canaries. His later voyages resulted in further exploration of Cuba and in the discovery of South and Central America. At first South America, the Mundus Novus (New World) was considered to be a great island of continental proportions; but as a result of his fourth voyage, it was apparently considered to be identical with the great Upper India peninsula (India Superior) represented by Behaim – the Cape of Cattigara. This seems to be the best interpretation of the sketch map made by Alessandro Zorzi on the advice of Bartholomew Columbus (Christopher's brother) around 1506, which bears an inscription saying that according to the ancient geographer Marinus of Tyre and Christopher Columbus the distance from Cape St Vincent on the coast of Portugal to Cattigara on the peninsula of India Superior was 225 degrees, while according to Ptolemy the same distance was 180 degrees.

Early modern Ottoman Empire
Prior to the 16th century, knowledge of geography in the Ottoman Empire was limited in scope, with almost no access to the works of earlier Islamic scholars that superseded Ptolemy. His Geography would again be translated and updated with commentary into Arabic under Mehmed II, who commissioned works from Byzantine scholar George Amiroutzes in 1465 and the Florentine humanist Francesco Berlinghieri in 1481.

Longitudes error and Earth size

There are two related errors:

 Considering a sample of 80 cities amongst the 6345 listed by Ptolemy, those that are both identifiable and for which we can expect a better distance measurement since they were well known, there is a systematic overestimation of the longitude by a factor 1.428 with a high confidence (coefficient of determination r² = 0.9935). This error produces evident deformations in Ptolemy's world map most apparent for example in the profile of Italy, which is markedly stretched horizontally.
 Ptolemy accepted that the known Ecumene spanned 180° of longitude, but instead of accepting Eratosthenes's estimate for the circumference of the Earth of 252,000 stadia, he shrinks it to 180,000 stadia, with a factor of 1.4 between the two figures.

This suggests Ptolemy rescaled his longitude data to fit with a figure of 180,000 stadia for the circumference of the earth, which he described as a "general consensus". Ptolemy rescaled experimentally obtained data in many of his works on geography, astrology, music, and optics.

Gallery

See also

 Almagest, Ptolemy's astronomical work
 Bibliotheca historica
 Diodorus Siculus
 Geography and cartography in medieval Islam
 Strabo
 List of most expensive books and manuscripts

Notes

Citations

References
 . 
 .
 
 .
 .
 .
 .
 .
 
 .
 . 
 
 .
 .
 .

 . 
 . 
 .

Further reading
Berggren, J. Lennart and Jones, Alexander. 2000. Ptolemy's Geography: An Annotated Translation of the Theoretical Chapters. Princeton University Press. Princeton and Oxford. .
 Blažek, Václav. "Etymological Analysis of Toponyms from Ptolemy's Description of Central Europe". In: Studia Celto-Slavica 3 (2010): 21–45. DOI: https://doi.org/10.54586/GTQF3679.
 Blažek, Václav. "The North-Eastern Border of the Celtic World". In: Studia Celto-Slavica 8 (2018): 7–21. DOI: https://doi.org/10.54586/ZMEE3109. 
Cosgrove, Dennis.  2003.  Apollo's Eye: A Cartographic Genealogy of the Earth in the Western Imagination.  Johns Hopkins University Press.  Baltimore and London.
Gautier Dalché, Patrick. 2009. La Géographie de Ptolémée en Occident (IVe-XVIe siècle). Terratum Orbis.  Turnhout. Brepols, .
Shalev, Zur, and Charles Burnett, eds. 2011. Ptolemy's Geography in the Renaissance. London; Turin. Warburg Institute; Nino Aragno. (In Appendix: Latin text of Jacopo Angeli's introduction to his translation of the Geography, with English translation by C. Burnett.)
Stevenson, Edward Luther. Trans. and ed. 1932. Claudius Ptolemy: The Geography. New York Public Library. Reprint: Dover, 1991. This is the only complete English translation of Ptolemy's most famous work. Unfortunately, it is marred by numerous mistakes (see Diller) and the place names are given in Latinised forms, rather than in the original Greek.

External links

Primary sources
Greek
  Claudii Ptolemaei Geographia, ed. Karl Friedrich August Nobbe, Sumptibus et typis Caroli Tauchnitii, 1843, tom. I (books 1-4, missing p. 126); 1845, tom. II (books 5-8); 1845, tom. III (indices).

Latin
  La Cosmographie de Claude Ptolemée, Latin manuscript copied around 1411
  Geography, digitized codex made in Italy between 1460 and 1477, translated to Latin by Jacobus Angelus at Somni. Also known as codex valentinus, it is the oldest manuscript of the codices with maps of Ptolemy with the donis projections.
  "Cosmographia" / Claudius Ptolemaeus. Translated into Latin by Jacobus Angelus, and edited by Nicolaus Germanus. - Ulm : Lienhart Holle. - 1482. (In the National Library of Finland.)
  Geographia Universalis, Basileae apud Henricum Petrum mense Martio anno M. D. XL. [of Basel, printed by Henricus Petrus in the month of March in the year 1540].
  Geographia Cl. Ptolemaei Alexandrini, Venetiis : apud Vincentium Valgrisium, Venezia, 1562.

Italian
  Geografia cioè descrittione vniuersale della terra partita in due volumi..., In Venetia : appresso Gio. Battista et Giorgio Galignani fratelli, 1598.
  Geografia di Claudio Tolomeo alessandrino, In Venetia : appresso gli heredi di Melchior Sessa, 1599.

English
 Ptolemy's Geography at LacusCurtius (English translation) 
 Extracts of Ptolemy on the country of the Seres (China) (English translation)
 1st critical edition of Geography Book 8, by Aubrey Diller
 Geography Books 2.10-6.11 in English, with most Greece-related places geolocated, by John Brady Kiesling at ToposText
 in Russian/English, Map of οἰκουμένη, by Gusev etc.

Secondary material
Ptolemy the Geographer

Ptolemy's Geography of Asia - Selected problems of Ptolemy's Geography of Asia (in German)
History of Cartography  including a discussion of the Geographia

Works by Ptolemy
2nd-century books
Atlases
Geographic information systems
Map projections
Geographic coordinate systems
Land surveying systems
History of geography
Geography books
Historic maps of the Roman Empire
Maps